Profundiconus dondani is a species of sea snail, a marine gastropod mollusk in the family Conidae, the cone snails and their allies.

Like all species within the genus Profundiconus, these cone snails are predatory and venomous. They are capable of "stinging" humans, therefore live ones should be handled carefully or not at all.

Description
The size of the shell varies between 16 mm and 33 mm.

Distribution
This marine species occurs off the Philippines.

References

 Kosuge S. (1981) Studies on the collection of Mr. Victor Dan (4) Descriptions of new species of the genera Lyria, Conus and Fissidentalium. Bulletin of the Institute of Malacology, Tokyo 1(7): 113–115, pl. 39. 31. [30 October 1981]
page(s): 114, pl. 39 figs 8-9
 Tucker J.K. & Tenorio M.J. (2013) Illustrated catalog of the living cone shells. 517 pp. Wellington, Florida: MdM Publishing.
  Puillandre N., Duda T.F., Meyer C., Olivera B.M. & Bouchet P. (2015). One, four or 100 genera? A new classification of the cone snails. Journal of Molluscan Studies. 81: 1-23

External links
 The Conus Biodiversity website
 Cone Shells – Knights of the Sea
 

dondani
Gastropods described in 1981